Cheryl H. Arrowsmith is a Canadian structural biologist and is the Chief Scientist at the Toronto laboratory of the Structural Genomics Consortium.  Her contributions to protein structural biology includes the use of NMR and X-ray crystallography to pursue structures of proteins on a proteome wide scale.

She received her Ph.D. in chemistry at the University of Toronto in 1987 and post-doctoral training at Stanford University working with Oleg Jardetzky.  One of her areas of interest is the tumour suppressor p53 and related proteins.

Her current research is to determine the 3-dimensional structures of human proteins of therapeutic relevance by structural proteomics. She has made significant contributions to epigenetic signaling in the context of drug discovery.

Arrowsmith was named a Fellow of the American Association for the Advancement of Science (AAAS) in 2015.

References

Living people
University of Toronto alumni
Canadian company founders
Technology company founders
Canadian women company founders
Structural biologists
Canadian geneticists
Canadian biochemists
Women biochemists
Canadian women geneticists
Canadian women biologists
Canadian women chemists
21st-century Canadian women scientists
21st-century Canadian biologists
21st-century chemists
Year of birth missing (living people)
Place of birth missing (living people)
Fellows of the American Association for the Advancement of Science